Halloween Wars  is an American reality competition series from Super Delicious, the production company that also produces Cupcake Wars and Cake Wars. It premiered on October 2, 2011, on Food Network and it runs over the course of four weeks in October annually. The show pits five teams made up of cake sculptors, sugar artists, and pumpkin carvers against each other to produce the ultimate Halloween themed display. The winning team is awarded $50,000.

The series was hosted by Justin Willman (seasons 1–4), Rossi Morreale (season 5), Jonathan Bennett (seasons 6-10), and is currently hosted by paranormal investigator Zak Bagans from Ghost Adventures.

Rounds 
Each episode has two rounds. The first round is the "Small Scare" where the teams of trios get 45 minutes to create their interpretation of a spooky theme (ex: "possessed electronics" or "zombie dolls"). The winners of the first round get an extra assistant for the second round (starting in season three, winners of the final episode "Small Scare" round get first pick of the pumpkins).

The second round is the "Spine Chiller" where the teams get five hours to create a large-scale, immersive sculpture based on a new theme. They must also serve a tasting element that usually have something to do with the theme. The themes for the second round relate to the title of each episode (like in "Zombies vs Vampires" where the teams had to create a scene depicting a zombie battling a vampire using cake, candy, and pumpkin).
Interdicting Halloween wars section
Halloween Wars is an American reality competition series from Super Delicious, the production company that also produces Cupcake Wars and Cake Wars. It premiered on October 2, 2011, on Food Network and it runs over the course of four weeks in October annually. Halloween wars section
Interdicting Halloween wars section
Halloween Wars is an American reality competition series from Super Delicious, the production company that also produces Cupcake Wars and Cake Wars. It premiered on October 2, 2011, on Food Network and it runs over the course of four weeks in October annually. Halloween wars section
Interdicting of Halloween wars section

Interdicting Halloween wars section

Interdicting Halloween wars section

Judges 
There are three judges in the series, with two of them serving as permanent judges in seasons 1-10. Throughout the series award-winning cake artist Shinmin Li served as permanent judge. Hollywood conceptual artist Miles Teves was the second judge in season 1. Actor and award-winning special effects artist Tom Savini was the second judge in season 2. Emmy-nominated SFX make-up artist Brian Kinney was the second judge in seasons 3–5. Writer/director of Child's Play, Don Mancini joined Shinmin in season 6. Director and effects artist Todd Tucker was the male judge in seasons 7–10. Starting in season 11, Food Network Star winners Aarti Sequeira and Eddie Jackson both served as permanent judges along with Shinmin.

In addition to the two regular judges throughout seasons 1-10, each episode had a third special guest judge that is involved in horror, whether as an actor, a writer, etc.

Episodes 

September 18,2022

References

External links 
 
 

2010s American cooking television series
2011 American television series debuts
Food Network original programming
Food reality television series